On a Piece of Chalk was a lecture given by Thomas Henry Huxley on 26 August 1868 to the working men of Norwich during a meeting of the British Association for the Advancement of Science. It was published as an essay in Macmillan's Magazine in London later that year. The piece reconstructs the geological history of Britain from a simple piece of chalk and demonstrates science as "organized common sense".

On a Piece of Chalk was republished by Scribner in 1967 with an introduction by Loren Eiseley and illustrations by Rudolf Freund.

Reception
In 1967, Dael Wolfle of the AAAS gave a favorable review for On a Piece of Chalk, writing:

In April 2015, physicist and Nobel laureate Steven Weinberg included On a Piece of Chalk in a personal list of "the 13 best science books for the general reader".

See also
 White Cliffs of Dover

References

External links 
 Full text of the essay, hosted by Clark University.

Scientific essays
Geology books
1868 essays